The Grand Mosque is the largest mosque in Kuwait. Natural lighting is provided by 144 windows.

Overview
The mosque can accommodate up to 10,000 men in the main prayer hall, and up to 950 women in the separate hall for women. The mosque also contains a  library of Islamic reference books and documents. To accommodate the large number of vehicles belonging to worshippers, the mosque also contains a 5-level car park underneath the eastern courtyard which can hold up to 550 cars. Construction on the mosque started in 1979, and the mosque was completed in 1986, first of  Shawwaal in 1407, or Eid ul-Fitr. The mosque's minaret, located at the northwest corner, resembles Andalusian architecture.

See also
 The Grand Mosque of Kuwait
 List of mosques in Kuwait
 Islam in Kuwait

1986 establishments in Kuwait
Mosques in Kuwait
Buildings and structures in Kuwait City
Mosques completed in 1986
Kuwait